Romain Guillemois (born 28 March 1991 in Marmande) is a French former cyclist, who rode professionally between 2014 and 2017 for the  team.

Major results

2009
 3rd Overall Liège-La Gleize
1st Stage 2 (TTT) 
 4th Road race, UCI Junior Road World Championships
2010
 2nd Paris–Tours Espoirs
 3rd Paris-Connerré
 5th Chrono des Nations
2011
 3rd Overall Boucles de la Mayenne
1st Stage 1
2012
 1st Boucles Catalanes
2013
 1st Stage 2 Boucles de la Mayenne
 6th Overall Coupe des nations Ville Saguenay
 6th Road race, Jeux de la Francophonie 
 7th Liège–Bastogne–Liège Espoirs
 9th Paris–Tours Espoirs
 10th Tour du Doubs
2015
 10th Tour du Doubs

References

External links

1991 births
Living people
French male cyclists
People from Marmande
Sportspeople from Lot-et-Garonne
Cyclists from Nouvelle-Aquitaine